Raphaël Mussard (born March 6, 1971), better known by his stage name Faf Larage, is a French rapper of Malagasy and Reunionese origins.

Biography
Raphaël Mussard was born in Marseille, Bouches-du-Rhône. He made his debut in the group "Soul Swing And Radikal" under the pseudonym "Raff Rage". In 1998 he released a solo album titled C'est ma Cause. His brother Shurik'n is a member of rap group IAM. Together they released an album called La Garde in 2000. In 2003, along with Eben (2Neg) and under the pseudonym of "Gomez & Dubois", he released the album Cops and off-the-law parodying the world's policemen. The album received an award in France in 2004 for best rap album.

In 2006 he performed the theme song for the French version of the TV series Prison Break, which reached the top spot in the French Top 50.

Albums 
1999: C'est Ma cause
1999: Le Pack Ego Trip: Hip Hop Non Stop ... 2000 (EP)
2000: La Garde (along with Shurik'n)
2003: Flic$ & Hor$ La Loi (along with avec Eben)
2007: Rap Stories (Singles: Pas le temps, Ta Meuf (La Caille), C'est De L'Or (with Taïro), C'est pas ma faute)

Appearances

1997 
 Faf Larage - Le Fainéant
 Faf Larage - Hip-Hop Marseillais
 Faf Larage Feat Shurik'n - La Garde meurt mais ne se rend pas

1998 
 Faf Larage Feat New African Poets (NAP) - 5 ans de répis
 Faf Larage - Ils deviennent ce qu'ils voient
 Faf Larage Feat Akhenaton, 3e Oeil, Mc Arabica & Fonky Family - Le Retour du Shit Squad sur la compile Chroniques de Mars Vol.1
 Faf Larage - La cavale
 Faf Larage - Hip-Hop Protagonist
 Shurik'n Feat Faf Larage - Le destin n'a pas de roi
 Shurik'n Feat Faf Larage - Esprit anesthésié sur l'album de Shurik'n, Où je vis
 Shurik'n Feat Faf Larage - Mon clan sur l'album de Shurik'n, Où je vis

1999 
 Faf Larage - Méchante soirée
 Faf Larage - C'est notre hip-hop

2000 
 Faf Larage Feat Taïro - Mea Culpa
 Faf Larage Feat. Prodigal Sunn & Dreddy Krueger - Saga 2000

2002 
 Faf Larage - T'es ombré sur la compile Liberté d'expression Vol.3

2003 
 Faf Larage Feat IAM - Le Couteau entre les dents
 Faf Larage Feat IAM, K'Rhyme Le Roi & Def Bond - History
 Faf Larage Feat Nach, La voz de los grandes - Poesia difusa

2004 
 Faf Larage Feat Akhenaton - L'Américain sur la B.O. du film L'américain
 Faf Larage Feat Habib Bamogo - Mars dans la peau sur la compile OM All Stars
 IPM Feat Faf Larage - Les sales potes sur l'album d'IPM, 1 pied dans le biz
 Rival Feat Faf Larage - Underground City sur la compile Bastard Academy
 Faf Larage- Mr Claude dans le jeu Hitman: Contracts, dans la dernière mission, dans la chambre d'un camé.

2006 
 Faf Larage Feat Akhenaton & Veust Lyricist - Commode le dégueulasse
 Faf Larage - Pas le temps sur la B.O. de la série Prison Break

2007 
 Faf Larage Feat Arno - I'm not into hope
 Faf Larage - Mefi sur la mixtape d'IAM, Official Mixtape
 Faf Larage Feat Taïro - C'est De L'Or
 Faf Larage - M. le Juge sur la compile Chroniques de Mars Vol.2
 Faf Larage - C'est pas ma faute

2009 
 Faf Larage Feat Magic System et Najim - Neuilly sa Mère sur la B.O. du film Neuilly-sa-Mère.
 Faf Larage Feat Def Bond - Shining Star sur l'album de Def Bond - LOVE

References

1971 births
Living people
Musicians from Marseille
Rappers from Bouches-du-Rhône
French people of Malagasy descent
French people of Réunionnais descent
Réunionnais singers